Claudia Chiper (born 16 June 1995) is a Moldovan footballer who plays as a forward for Cypriot club Pyrgos Limassol FA and the Moldova women's national team. Before being promoted to the senior team, she played for the under 17 and under 19 national teams.

See also
List of Moldova women's international footballers

References

External links
 

1995 births
Living people
Moldovan women's footballers
Women's association football forwards
Moldova women's international footballers
Moldovan expatriate women's footballers
Moldovan expatriates in Cyprus
Expatriate women's footballers in Cyprus